"Riot dog" is a term used by English-speaking media denoting any of the stray dogs that accompanied street protesters in Athens, Greece, in the aftermath of the 2008 financial crisis, when the country was plunged into a severe recession by the Greek government-debt crisis. It has been observed that a number of these dogs remained among the protesters even when violent rioting breaks out. Greece's Riot Dogs acquired a large following of fans around the world via the media of the internet as a symbol of the protests of the everyman against an oligarchic government state.

The dogs
Kanellos (: cinnamon), a distinct blonde, male, mixed-breed canine, was arguably the first incarnation of the Greek Riot Dog. His maiden appearance was in photographs taken at a general assembly of students in the occupied National Technical University of Athens. Kanellos became famous in the 2008 Greek riots, when Greek photographers and cameramen started to notice a dog that kept appearing in their footage. The stray seemed to always walk amongst and side with the protesters.

According to reports by witnesses, Kanellos, in his final years, suffered from arthritis, which motivated a group of college students to collect money and purchase him a dog's wheelchair. This allowed him to live indoors, among the students, until he died.

Thodoris is a Kanellos look-alike, believed to be one of Kanellos' pups. Thodoris is a light golden-colored, mixed breed dog, who, despite being a stray, has seemingly been provided with all the necessary medical shots, as evidenced by his blue collar.

Loukanikos (: the sausage loukaniko) or more commonly Louk, sometimes confused by the media for Kanellos, has been present at nearly every recent protest in Athens in the past few years. This stray has ostensibly become the symbol of Greek protests against the IMF- and ECB-prompted austerity measures. There's uncertainty about the claim that Loukanikos and Thodoris may, in fact, be the same dog however this was later confirmed false after Loukanikos died due to ingestion of tear gas, due to constant protesting.

In September 2011, on the occasion of a striking policemen's union marching in the centre of Athens, Loukanikos, according to eyewitnesses, was "initially confused" between two opposite sides both of uniformed policemen but, when the riot police contingent attacked their striking colleagues, the dog sided with "those who were being attacked."

Loukanikos' health was "severely burdened" by the inhaling of tear gas and other chemicals during the many riots in which he participated but lived until approximately ten years of age, dying peacefully on 9 October 2014 at the home of a person who cared for him.

Other dogs

In Chile, in the 2010s, a stray dog accompanied student protests. Protesters named him "Negro Matapacos" (from Spanish matar, to kill, and paco, which is Chilean slang for "policeman"; his full nickname therefore translates to "Black Cop-killer"), or refer to him simply as "El Negro". Matapacos died on 26 August 2017 of old age with a veterinarian and other people by his side.

During the Chilean protests of 2019–2020, other dogs were seen alongside protesters. Such is the case of Pepe Matapacos (shortened as "Pepe") in Concepción and Vaquita ("little cow" because of his white and black-dotted fur) in Antofagasta.

In culture

In 2011, American singer/songwriter David Rovics released a song entitled "The Riot Dog".

Loukanikos appears as a non-playable character in the video game Tonight We Riot, in which he assists the player in a left-wing revolution.

Gallery

See also
 2008 Greek riots
 2010–2011 Greek protests
 List of individual dogs

References

External links
Kanellos | Facebook 
Louk | Facebook
Loukanikos | Facebook
"The Greek protest dog" picture gallery in The Guardian

Video footage
"Sausage, the riot dog of Greece", Reuters report
"Greece's front-line riot dog", BBC News
"Riot dog stands his ground as Greek firefighters protest in Central Athens-March 26, 2009", independent media

Individual dogs
Political activism
Political movements in Greece